A bottom crawler is an underwater exploration and recovery vehicle. It is designed to sink to the bottom of a body of water, where it moves about using traction against the bottom with wheels or tracks. It is usually tethered to a surface ship by cables providing power, control, video, and lifting capabilities, but this is not essential.

Such devices have been proposed for use in recovering deep seabed minerals, such as manganese nodules.

These also have been considered since the late 1960s for use in offshore oil exploration and production in extremely deep water, but practical devices have used other technologies from the sea surface, such as moored barges and tension leg platforms.

References

Oceanography